The List of shipwrecks in 1785 includes some ship sunk, wrecked or otherwise lost during 1785.

January

2 January

5 January

7 January

8 January

16 January

21 January

31 January

Unknown date

February

9 February

15 February

17 February

21 February

24 February

Unknown date

March

15 March

17 March

29 March

Unknown date

April

1 April

10 April

Unknown date

May

4 May

24 May

Unknown date

June

Unknown date

July

3 July

8 July

9 July

23 July

30 July

Unknown date

August

25 August

26 August

Unknown date

September

1 September

4 September

6 September

22 September

24 September

27 September

Unknown date

October

15 October

20 October

24 October

26 October

27 October

28 October

31 October

Unknown date

November

4 November

5 November

24 November

27 November

Unknown date

December

4 December

6 December

7 December

9 December

14 December

15 December

22 December

26 December

28 December

31 December

Unknown date

Unknown date

References

1785